The Subcommittee on National Security, the Border and Foreign Affairs is a subcommittee of the United States House Committee on Oversight and Accountability. Jurisdiction includes oversight of national security, homeland security, and foreign policy. It was restructured and expanded during the 112th Congress after a committee reorganization spearheaded by full committee chairman Darrell Issa. During Democratic control from 2019 to 2023, it was known as the Subcommittee on National Security.

Jurisdiction
[The Subcommittee] shall have oversight jurisdiction over: national security; homeland security; foreign operations, including the relationships of the United States with other nations; immigration; defense; issues affecting veterans; and oversight and legislative jurisdiction over federal acquisition policy related to national security.

Members, 118th Congress

Historical membership

110th Congress

111th Congress

112th Congress

113th Congress

114th Congress

115th Congress

116th Congress

References

External links
Subcommittee page

Oversight National Security